The IPSC Venezuelan Handgun Championship is an IPSC level 3 championship held once a year by the Practical Shooting Federation of Venezuela.

Champions 
The following is a list of previous and current champions.

Overall category

References 

IPSC shooting competitions
National shooting championships
Shooting competitions in Venezuela